Tom Gates is a British series of fiction and graphic books written by Liz Pichon taking the form of an illustrated diary written by the eponymous schoolboy. The first book in the series, The Brilliant World of Tom Gates, was published in 2011 and won the Roald Dahl Funny Prize, a Red House Children's Book Award and a Waterstones Children's Book Prize. As of 2020 the books have sold more than 11 million copies worldwide and have been translated into 44 languages.

Background

Aged around 12 years old, Tom is the younger of the two children of Frank and Rita Gates, and the younger brother of Delia. He attends Oakfield Primary School where he is in Mr Fullerman's Class 5F, under headmaster Mr Keen. Children in his class include Marcus Meldrew (who sits next to and consistently annoys Tom in class), and Amy Porter (who also sits next to Tom, but whom Tom hopes to impress). Also in his year at Oakfield is his best friend Derek Fingle, who also lives next door to him. Tom has a second neighbour, June Jones, that annoys Tom and dislikes his band.

His grandparents are Frank's parents Granny Mavis And Granddad Bob that Tom refers to as "The Fossils", while Rita's parents are known as "The Wrinklies".

Tom and Derek are in a band called Dog Zombies, consisting of Tom on guitar, Derek on keyboard, and classmate Norman Watson on drums.

Books

 The Brilliant World of Tom Gates (2011) 
 Tom Gates: Excellent Excuses (And Other Good Stuff) (2011)
 Tom Gates: Everything's Amazing (Sort Of) (2011)
 Tom Gates: Genius Ideas (Mostly) (2012)
 Tom Gates Is Absolutely Fantastic (at Some Things) (2013)
 Tom Gates: Extra Special Treats (not) (2013)
 Tom Gates: A Tiny Bit Lucky (2014)
 Tom Gates: Yes! No (Maybe... ) (2015)
 Tom Gates: Top of the Class (Nearly) (2015)
 Tom Gates: Super Good Skills (Almost...) (2016)
 Tom Gates: DogZombies Rule (For Now) (2016)
 Tom Gates: Family, Friends and Furry Creatures (2017)
 Tom Gates: Epic Adventure (kind of) (2017)
 Tom Gates: Biscuits, Bands and Very Big Plans (2018)
 Tom Gates: What Monster? (2018)
 Tom Gates: Mega Make and Do (and Stories Too!) (2019)
 Tom Gates: Spectacular School Trip (really!) (2019)
 Tom Gates: Ten Tremendous Tales (2021)
 Tom Gates: Random Acts Of Fun  (2021)
 Tom Gates: Happy To Help (kind of) (2022)

Additional books
 Tom Gates: Best Book Day Ever! (so far) (2013)
 Tom Gates: The Big Book Of Fun Stuff (2014)
 Tom Gates: Totally Brilliant Annual (2017)
 Tom Gates: The Music Book (2019)
 Tom Gates: You Can Draw  (2022)
 Tom Gates: Totally Brilliant Advent Calendar (2022)

Adaptations

In 2019, at the Palace Theatre, there was a stage play called "Tom Gates: Live!" featuring the characters in live action. In 2020, Sky Kids announced that it was making The Brilliant World of Tom Gates to be available on Sky’s on demand service Sky Kids in the UK and Ireland. Series 1, consisting of 20 animated episodes, was released in early 2021, featuring Catherine Tate as Rita Gates, Mark Bonnar as Mr Fullerman, and Logan Matthews as Tom Gates. Creator Liz Pichon also appears in the episodes in a live-action segment in which she gives ideas for creating artwork inspired by the series. Series 2 was released in 2022.

Awards

References

Book series introduced in 2011
Series of children's books